Tian Han (12 March 1898 – 10 December 1968), formerly romanized as T'ien Han, was a Chinese drama activist, playwright, a leader of revolutionary music and films, as well as a translator and poet. He emerged at the time of the New Culture Movement of the early 20th century and continued to be active until the Cultural Revolution, when he was denounced and jailed for two years until his death, before being "posthumously rehabilitated" by the Chinese authorities in 1979. He is considered by drama historians as one of the three founders of Chinese spoken drama, together with Ouyang Yuqian and Hong Shen. His most famous legacy may be the lyrics he wrote for "March of the Volunteers" in 1934, which were later adopted as the national anthem of the People's Republic of China.

Biography

During the May Fourth Movement in 1919, Tian became famous for the vigorous anti-imperialist and anti-feudalist activities in the circle of artists and intellectuals he gathered.

Tian was educated at Tokyo Higher Normal School (present-day University of Tsukuba) in Japan. Returning from Japan in 1921, Tian established the Creation Society together with Guo Moruo and Yu Dafu, and other Chinese intellectuals. The Southern China Society, also headed by Tian, played a leading role in promoting dramatic performances in southern China. In 1927, Tian taught at the Department of Literature of Shanghai Art University. Later, he joined The League of Chinese Left-Wing Dramatists. In 1934, he collaborated with the activist Liu Liangmo on the patriotic anthem, March of the Volunteers.

Tian used various aliases and pen names including his courtesy name Tián Shòuchāng, Bóhóng, Chén Yú, Shùrén, and Hànxiān.

Tian, then Chairman of the Union of Chinese Drama Workers and Vice-Chairman of the All China's Federation of Literary and Art Circles, was targeted by the Gang of Four and attacked during the Cultural Revolution in 1966 for his historical play Xie Yaohuan (1961), which was regarded as an attack on Chairman Mao's policies and the CCP leadership. Criticism of this play, along with two other historical plays (Hai Rui Dismissed from Office by Wu Han and Li Huiniang by Meng Chao), were the opening salvos of the Cultural Revolution.  Tian was denounced in a 1 February 1966 People's Daily article entitled "Xie Yaohuan is a Big Poisonous Weed" (田汉的《谢瑶环》是一棵大毒草 Tián Hàn de Xiè Yáohuán Shì yī kē Dà Dúcǎo). The Jiefang Daily called Xie Yaohuan a "political manifesto". The play was condemned for, among other things, of "being a wholesale inheritance of China's theatrical legacy and promoting traditional plays", "disparaging revolutionary modern plays" and "promoting bourgeois class liberalism and obfuscating the direction for the workers, peasants and soldiers". Tian was subsequently persecuted by the Gang of Four and incarcerated as a "counterrevolutionary" in a prison which was run personally by Kang Sheng, and died there in 1968. After the end of the Cultural Revolution, he and Xie Yaohuan were “rehabilitated posthumously” (considered to be rehabilitated after death) in 1979.

Works
Although a proponent of western style theater (話劇 huàjù) in China, Tian also produced a number of works with historical themes.

Major plays
Kafeidian Yi Ye (A Night in the Coffee Shop) 1922
Wufan Zhiqian (Before Lunch) 1922
Huo Hu Zhi Ye (A Night of Capturing the Tiger) 1924
Suzhou Ye Hua (Night Talk of Suzhou) 1928 
Hu Shang de Beiju (A Tragedy of the Lake) 1928
Ming You Zhi Si (Death of a Noted Actor) 1929
Nan Gui 1929
Mei Yu (Plum Rains) 1932
Yueguang Qu (Moonlight Melody) 1932
Luan Zhong 1932
Yangzi Jiang de Bao Feng Yu (Storm on the Yangtze) 1935
Hui Chun Zhi Qu (Spring Melody) 1935 
Hong Shui (Flood) 1935
Lugou Qiao (Lugou Bridge) 1937
Han Jiang Yu Ge (Fisherman's Song of the Han River) 1939 
Qiu Sheng Fu 1942
Liren Xing (Women Side by Side) 
Guan Hanqing 1958
Xiè Yáohuán 1961

Librettos
Baishe Zhuan (The White Snake) (1958)

Film scripts
 Go to the People 到民间去 (Dao minjian qu) (1927) (unfinished) 
Three Modern Women (1932)
Sons and Daughters in a Time of Storm (1935)
Women Side by Side (1949)
A Test of Love (1958)

Song lyrics
"March of the Volunteers" (1935)
"The Wandering Songstress" (1937)

Translations
Salomé (Oscar Wilde) (1921)

In popular culture
Tian Han was the prototype for the figure of "Kuang Wentao" (played by Bo Gao) in the 1959 biopic Nie Er, which retold the story of the composition of the Chinese National Anthem on the 10th anniversary of the founding of the People's Republic. For the 50th anniversary in 1999, he was represented directly in the film The National Anthem, played by He Zhengjun. His story was also told in The National Anthem, a 27-episode television series, and in the play Torrent (Kuángliú), produced in Beijing in the year 2000.

In the 2009 film The Founding of a Republic, he was portrayed by Donnie Yen.

References

References and further reading 
  Includes translations of plays, background on Tian and modern drama.
 , esp. pp. 91-92, 115-127.

External links

Liang Luo, "From Lovers to Volunteers: Tian Han and the National Anthem," China Beat (July 16, 2008).

1898 births
1968 deaths
Chinese dramatists and playwrights
National anthem writers
Writers from Changsha
Republic of China translators
People's Republic of China translators
Chinese lyricists
Musicians from Changsha
People persecuted to death during the Cultural Revolution
Republic of China poets
People's Republic of China poets
20th-century Chinese translators
Poets from Hunan
20th-century Chinese dramatists and playwrights
University of Tsukuba alumni
Chinese silent film directors